The list of shipwrecks in 1918 includes ships sunk, foundered, grounded, or otherwise lost during 1918.

January

February

March

April

May

June

July

August

September

October

November

December

Unknown date

References

See also

1918
 
Ships